Tetrahydroxy-1,4-benzoquinone bisoxalate is a chemical compound, an oxide of carbon with formula . Its molecule consists of a 1,4-benzoquinone core with the four hydrogen atoms replaced by two oxalate groups. It can be seen as a fourfold ester of tetrahydroxy-1,4-benzoquinone and oxalic acid.

The compound was first described by H. S. Verter, H. Porter, and R. Dominic in 1968. It was obtained by reacting tetrahydroxy-1,4-benzoquinone with oxalyl chloride in  tetrahydrofuran. It is a yellow solid that can be crystallized as a tetrahydrofuran solvate, but could not be prepared in pure form.

See also
 Tetrahydroxy-1,4-benzoquinone biscarbonate
 Hexahydroxybenzene trisoxalate
 Hexahydroxybenzene triscarbonate

References

Oxocarbons
1,4-Benzoquinones
Oxalate esters
Oxygen heterocycles
Heterocyclic compounds with 3 rings